Malaysian Heritage and History Club (MHHC) aims to provide an objective, truthful and balanced account of Malaysian history, promote inter-ethnic relations and forge greater national unity.

Background
MHHC is a Facebook-based group, created on October 13, 2012. The club as of May 21st, 2017 has 16,487 members. Topics discussed in the group are mostly Malaysian history, heritage, culture, wildlife and natural heritage. The group is often used as source of information by students, researchers, individuals, online websites and local dailies.

On the Facebook platform, English is the preferred language in the club to benefit its international audience and enable a wider scope for exchange of ideas. Bahasa Malaysia and other languages are acceptable. Where translations are not provided, other members of the group will offer translations, particularly when important topics are being discussed or when requested. Author and composer Saidah Rastam in her book Rosalie and Other Love Songs , acknowledged the Club - " The Malaysian Heritage and History Club has irreverent but erudite members " .

The Club organises many activities outside its Facebook platform, starting with Heritage Talks in Malacca since March 2013 and Heritage Talk KL Series in September 2013. Speakers are sourced from the Club members itself based on their own fields of expertise. Events are conducted in the spirit of sharing and collaboration. Most of the talks can be viewed on the club's dedicated MHHC Youtube channel.

Club's logo
The boat represents the journey of sharing and learning, discussions and debates sometimes stormy, sometimes calm. The color red is bold and brave - speaking out of the mind, yellow represents knowledge, blueish green sea waves signify challenges . Multiracialism and multiculturalism are represented by the use of multilingual text.

Heritage Talk
In March 2013, the Club organised its first monthly series of Heritage Talks in Melaka . Speakers were sourced from the Club members according to their expertise. 
They were held in Riverine Coffeehouse in Lorong Hang Jebat, Melaka from March 2013 to January 2015, before it closed down.
Daily Fix Cafe, which is located at Jonker Street (Jalan Hang Jebat) then offered its premises for the talks in March and April 2015. The last talk in Melaka was on WG Shellabear and was held at Shellabear Hall a former boarding house for Methodist Girls School in Tranquerah, Malacca.

Heritage Talk KL Series
As membership grew bigger, there were requests for talks to be held in Kuala Lumpur . D7 Sentul offered to host for KL talks starting in September 2013 . 
In September 2015 onwards all talks in KL were held at Badan Warisan, Kuala Lumpur.

Other Initiatives
In 2015, a collaboration with the Portuguese Malacca community and Baba Nyonya Heritage Museum Melaka was started to revive the old Melaka Chinese New Year practices. The Serani Teng Teng was revived and reintroduced during the New Old Malacca Exhibition. Serani Teng Teng is a group of buskers consisting of 3 Portuguese boys who went busking door to door around Malacca town on the first day of Chinese New Year. The revival of the Serani Teng Teng received wide media coverage and the actual busking took place during the first day of Chinese New Year in 2016
The first publication from the club was launched during the People's Merdeka Exhibition in September 2015. The book/zine "Messing with Melaka" consists of Melaka's historical facts, suggestions of places to eat and visit within 24 hours .

A dedicated book review blog  Hooked on Books  was created on September 20, 2015 . Members are free to submit their reviews which will be published in the blog.

Collaborators and friends
Baba Nyonya Heritage Museum Melaka Baba Nyonya Heritage Museum

Badan Warisan Malaysia Badan Warisan Malaysia

References
 MALAYSIANA: UNSHACKLING HISTORY
 Malaysians' new love for the old
 Drawing on heritage
  SAVING MALACCA: THE STORY OF AN OLD TOWN TOLD THROUGH ITS INHABITANTS
  A show by the people for the people
 MHHC Wild Wildlife with Tenok and Friends
 Who wins? Heritage town Pekan Ampang is in the way of the Suke Highway
 Our own May 13 stories - a celebration of love
 Dad's The Way

Facebook groups
Cultural history of Malaysia